Pribeta (Hungarian pronunciation:) is a village and municipality in the Komárno District in the Nitra Region of south-west Slovakia. In 2001 it had 3137 inhabitants of which 2403 Hungarian and 713 Slovak.

Geography
Pribeta is located 24 km from Komarno on road, in an area with hills. It is here that two main roads intersect. 589 (connecting Komarno with Kolta) and 509 (connecting Bajc with Sturovo). Pribeta possesses a railway station in Dvor Mikulas, which is a suburb 3 km north from the village on the road towards Dubnik.

There are two Pusztas within the village's area Michalovo and Pribetapuszta.

The village lies at an altitude of 136 metres and covers an area of 42.795 km2.
It has a population of about 3,080 people.

History
In the 9th century, the territory of Pribeta became part of the Kingdom of Hungary. In historical records the village was first mentioned in 1312.
After the Austro-Hungarian army disintegrated in November 1918, Czechoslovak troops occupied the area, later acknowledged internationally by the Treaty of Trianon. Between 1938 and 1945 Pribeta once more  became part of Miklós Horthy's Hungary through the First Vienna Award. From 1945 until the Velvet Divorce, it was part of Czechoslovakia. Since then it has been part of Slovakia.

Ethnicity
The village is about 77% Hungarian, 23% Slovak.

Facilities
The village has a public library, a gym and a football pitch.

References

External links

Villages and municipalities in the Komárno District
Hungarian communities in Slovakia